Mariani College, established in 1966, is a general degree college situated at Mariani, in Jorhat district, Assam. This college is affiliated with the Dibrugarh University.

Departments

Science
Physics
Mathematics
Chemistry
Botany
Zoology

Arts and Commerce
 Assamese
Bengali
 English
History
Education
Economics
Sanskrit
Political Science
Geography
Commerce

References

External links
http://www.marianicollege.org.in/

Universities and colleges in Assam
Colleges affiliated to Dibrugarh University
Educational institutions established in 1966
1966 establishments in Assam